The Gonzaga Bulldogs Men's Soccer program represents Gonzaga University in all NCAA Division I men's college soccer competitions. The Bulldogs play in the West Coast Conference. The Bulldogs are coached by Paul Meehan, who took over the head coaching position on January 1, 2018, from Einar Thorarinsson.

Thorarinsson had coached the team since he joined them in 1995 from Whitworth College. During his tenure they were transformed from a mediocre team, in 1994 they had gone 2-13-1, into an annual contender for the WCC men's soccer crown. He also led the Zags to their only two NCAA Tournament appearances in 2001 and 2007.

Honors
 1997: West Coast Conference Champions
 1998: West Coast Conference Champions

Notes

   Title shared with Santa Clara University in 1997 and University of San Diego in 1998

References

External links 
 Gonzaga Bulldogs Men's Soccer

 
1980 establishments in Washington (state)
Association football clubs established in 1980